Cheryl Yang (born 12 December 1977) is a Taiwanese actress. She joined the entertainment scene at the age of 14 when she filmed her first commercial. Not long after she started her career, she filmed a music video together with Andy Lau, which garnered her attention in the industry. She rose to prominence when she filmed the Taiwanese drama My Queen in 2009 with actor Ethan Juan.

Filmography

Film

Television series

Music video appearances

Theater
 "Shakespeare" by Edward Yang
 "The Importance of Being Earnest by Oscar Wilde

Awards and nominations

References

External links

 
In Music Official site 
1859's official blog
WeiBo
Cheryl Yang Instagram
Cheryl Yang Facebook

1977 births
Living people
Actresses from Taipei
Taiwanese film actresses
Taiwanese television actresses
Place of birth missing (living people)
21st-century Taiwanese actresses
Taiwanese stage actresses
Taiwanese female models